Luis Eduardo González (28 October 1945 – 10 September 2016) was a Uruguayan political scientist, sociologist and polling specialist. He was a professor at the University of the Republic and the Catholic University. He published, among others, in the Uruguayan Journal of Political Science, the Latin American Research Review, and the Mexican Journal of Sociology.

Biography
A deaf person, he was known for his voting turnout predictions. He was noted for his ability to listen to all tendencies.

Magister in Sociology, Department of Social Sciences, Fundación Bariloche, Argentina, 1976. He held a PhD in political science from Yale University, 1988. He lectured at Universidad de la República and UCUDAL.

In 1992, he founded the polling firm CIFRA - González, Raga y Asociados.

He worked as a consultant for IADB, INTAL, United Nations, and the World Bank.

Author of several specialized publications:
Political Structures and Democracy in Uruguay, Notre Dame University Press, 1991.
Los partidos políticos uruguayos en tiempos de cambio. UCUDAL/Fundación Banco de Boston, año 1999.

References

1945 births
2016 deaths
People from Montevideo
Uruguayan deaf people
Yale University alumni
Academic staff of the University of the Republic (Uruguay)
Academic staff of the University of Montevideo
Academic staff of the Catholic University of Uruguay
Uruguayan sociologists
Uruguayan political scientists
Survey methodologists
Psephologists
Scientists with disabilities